The Men's parallel giant slalom competition at the FIS Alpine World Ski Championships 2023 was held at Roc de Fer ski course in Méribel on 14 and 15 February 2023.

Qualification
The qualification was started on 14 February at 18:15.

Elimination round
The finals were started on 15 February at 12:00.

References

Men's parallel giant slalom